Franz Michael Permaneder (b. at Traunstein, Bavaria, 12 August 1794; d. at Regensburg, 10 October 1862) was a German canon lawyer.

He studied theology and jurisprudence at Landshut and in 1818 was ordained to the priesthood at Regensburg. He was appointed in 1834 professor of church history and canon law at the "Lyceum" of Freising, and in 1847 joined the theological faculty of the University of Munich.

He was contributor to the first edition of the Kirchenlexicon, and also wrote:

"Handbuch des gemeingültigen katholischen Kirchenrechts mit steter Rücksicht auf Deutschland" (Landshut, 1846); 
"Die kirchliche Baulast" (Munich, 1853); 
"Bibliotheca patristica" (incomplete; Landshut, 1841–44);
 a continuation of the "Annales almae literarum universitatis Ingolstadii" (Munich, 1859).

References

Schultr, Geschichte der Quell. U. Lit. des Kan. Rechts, III (Stuttgart, 1880), I, 356–57.

External links
Catholic Encyclopedia article

1794 births
1862 deaths
People from Traunstein
19th-century German Roman Catholic priests
19th-century German Catholic theologians
Canon law jurists
19th-century German male writers
German male non-fiction writers